Acalyptris lorantivora is a moth of the family Nepticulidae. It was described by Anthonie Johannes Theodorus Janse in 1948. It is known from South Africa (it was described from the Cape Province).

The larvae feed on Boscia oleoides.

References

Nepticulidae
Endemic moths of South Africa
Moths described in 1948